Ozhalapathy is a village in the Palakkad district, state of Kerala, India. It is administered by the Vadakarapathy gram panchayat.

Demographics
 India census, Ozhalapathy had a population of 9,085 with 4,519 males and 4,566 females.

References

Villages in Palakkad district